The Java class was a class of light cruisers of the Royal Netherlands Navy, with the lead ship named after the island of Java in the Dutch East Indies. Originally, three ships were planned: Java, Sumatra, and Celebes. Celebes was intended to be the flagship of the naval commander in the Dutch East Indies, and therefore she was slightly bigger than the other two ships. However, the contract was cancelled with 30 tons of material already prepared (a new ship,  was later built to fill that requirement).

The class was designed by the Dutch with technical oversight by the German company Krupp, and constructed in the Netherlands.  Armed with ten  guns, they were of comparable capability to the German and British cruisers designs of the time. However, these were not turret-mounted, and by the time the cruisers were finally launched after all the delays caused by the upheaval of World War I (Sumatra in 1920, Java in 1921), the ships had already become outdated. Nevertheless, both Sumatra and Java were still active at the outbreak of World War II, mainly for colonial duties. Both vessels were lost in the war, with Java torpedoed and sunk by the Japanese in 1942 in the Dutch East Indies and Sumatra scuttled as a breakwater during the Allied invasion of Normandy in 1944.

Design and description
The naval policy of the Netherlands in the early 20th century was focused on the colonial territories the nation had gathered, primarily the Dutch East Indies. At the time, the Dutch East Indies was a major supplier of oil and a source of wealth for the Dutch. However, with the onset of World War I and the rise of the Empire of Japan as a naval power in the Pacific, the Dutch could no longer match richer nations in the construction of large, powerful warships and instead focused their fleet policy on vessels capable of carrying out delaying and harassing actions until reinforced. The design of the new cruisers was completed in 1916, produced by Dutch naval architects with technical supervision from the German military supplier Krupp and reflected the era's layout of guns on a cruiser-sized ship. At the time when the design was completed, the cruisers would have been of comparable capability to concurrent British and German designs.

With their planned service in the Dutch East Indies, the Java class was designed with this in mind, as they were intended to be the most powerful ships on station in the area. As designed, the cruisers were to have machinery consisting of a three-shaft system of Germania geared turbines powered by steam created from eight oil-fired Schulz-Thornycroft boilers. However, during construction a fire destroyed the machinery of Sumatra and the Germania turbines were replaced by Zoelly-pattern turbines which later proved troublesome.

The Java class had a main armament of ten Bofors Mk 6 /50 calibre guns placed in single mounts, each with a forward facing gun shield. Two mounts were placed fore and aft along the centreline with guns "No.2" and "No.9" superfiring. The other six mounts were placed abeam, three to each side of the superstructure. A broadside from the cruisers would consist of seven guns. The 150 mm guns had a range of  when firing at an angle of 29 degrees. For secondary armament, the cruisers mounted four /55 cal. (13-pounder) guns.

As built, the cruisers had  armour in a waterline belt that extended  that covered the machinery and magazine spaces. The vessels had  deck armour that increased to 5 cm on the sloped sides where they meet the upper edge of the side belt. The funnel uptakes had 5 cm, the conning tower  and the gun shields  armour. Within the ship, the bulkheads had  armour.

Celebes, the third ship of the class, was to be constructed to a modified design.

Criticism of design
Since the design was completed in 1916, the armament layout reflected the ideas of the time. The placement of the guns in single mounts was based on the ironclad-age belief that if a direct hit to a gun would only disable the one gun, instead of multiple if the guns were placed in turrets. Furthermore, the guns were only protected by a forward-facing gun shield. This was done to save weight, as placing additional armour around the guns would have increased the vessel's displacement. These were flaws with the design, as the gunners were left exposed in battle and the gun layout prevented their full use.

Modifications
Shortly after entering service Java and Sumatra were fitted with aircraft and handling derricks for two Fairey IIID aircraft purchased in 1924. However, the Faireys proved to be too fragile for service in the Dutch East Indies and were replaced in 1926 with Fokker C.VII-W floatplanes. During a major refit in 1934–1935 the two cruisers had their pole foremast replaced with a tubular one that had a director tower atop with a searchlight platform. The mainmast was cut down and repositioned and the searchlights rearranged. Furthermore, the 75 mm guns were landed and replaced with six single-mounted Bofors Mk III  guns in Sumatra and eight in Java for anti-aircraft warfare. The new guns were fitted on the aft shelter deck. Additionally, four  machine guns were added.

Construction
The production of two cruisers was authorised on 15 July 1915 as part of the 1915–16 Dutch military programme. The design was completed in 1916 and orders were placed with the keel of the first ship of the class, Java, laid down on 31 May 1916 at the Schelde naval shipyards. The second ship, Sumatra, was laid down on 15 July 1916 at Nederlandse Scheepsbouw Maatschappij in Amsterdam. A third ship, Celebes, was ordered to a modified design on 14 June 1917 from the Wilton-Fijenoord shipyard in Schiedam. All ships were named for islands in the Dutch East Indies. However, construction was delayed due to a series of issues. Material shortages following the end of World War I, labour issues, political interference in the construction all led to delays. Furthermore, there was a serious fire that destroyed Celebes original Germania turbines and required their replacement with Zoelly-pattern versions. The construction of Celebes was cancelled after the budget for the third ship was delayed and her design was found to be obsolete. Only  of material had been prepared for Celebes construction and what had been built was broken up on the slipway. Despite the required replacement of her machinery, Sumatra was the first to launch on 29 December 1920. Java followed on 9 August 1921. However, Java was the first to commission, entering service on 1 May 1925, with Sumatra following on 26 May 1926.

Ships

Service history

Java

Java was already outdated technologically by the time she was commissioned in 1925. Java saw action, mostly as a convoy escort, during the Spanish Civil War and during the early stages of World War II. At the outbreak of war with Japan Java was in  Dutch East Indies waters where she formed part of the fleet of ABDA command under the command of Rear-Admiral Karel Doorman. She fought in the Battle of Badung Strait in February 1942. During the Battle of the Java Sea on 27 February 1942, she was sunk by a Long Lance torpedo from the Japanese cruiser  and sank with heavy loss of life.

Sumatra
Sumatra also performed convoy duties during World War II and transported part of the Dutch Royal Family to safety in Canada, but due to problems with her propulsion she was unfit for combat duty. In the end Sumatra was scuttled off the coast of Normandy on 9 June 1944 at Ouistreham as part of a "gooseberry" pier to protect an artificial Mulberry Harbour built by the Allies as part of Operation Overlord.

Notes

Citations

Sources

Further reading

External links

 Java-class cruisers

Cruiser classes